The following is a list of Lithuanian players in the National Basketball Association (NBA). The list also includes players who were born outside of Lithuania but have represented Lithuanian national team.

Players

Drafted but never played

See also
 Basketball in Lithuania

References

Lists of National Basketball Association players
National Basketball Association players from Lithuania
Basketball